The 2018–19 Skeleton World Cup was a multi-race series over a season for skeleton. The season started on 3 December 2018 in Sigulda, Latvia, and finished on 23 February 2019 in Calgary, Alberta, Canada. The World Cup was organised by the International Bobsleigh and Skeleton Federation, who also run World Cups and Championships in bobsleigh.  The title sponsor of the World Cup was again BMW.

Calendar
Anticipated schedule as announced by the IBSF:

Results

Men

Women

Standings

Men

Women

Medal table

References

Skeleton World Cup
2018 in skeleton
2019 in skeleton